Messina was the second of three s built for the Italian Regia Marina (Royal Navy) in the 1860s. She was laid down in September 1861, her hull was launched in December 1864, and she was completed in February 1867. Messina was a broadside ironclad armed with a battery of four  guns and eighteen  guns. Her career was limited, owing to the emergence of more modern ironclads and a severe reduction in the Italian naval budget following their defeat at the Battle of Lissa in 1866. She was discarded in 1875 and sold to ship breakers to help pay for new ironclads then under construction.

Design

She had a crew of 572. Her propulsion system consisted of one single-expansion marine steam engine that drove a single screw propeller, with steam supplied by six coal-fired, cylindrical fire-tube boilers. To supplement her steam engine, the ship was barque-rigged.

Messina was a broadside ironclad, and she was armed with a main battery of four 72-pounder  guns and eighteen  rifled muzzle-loading guns. The ship was equipped with a spur-shaped ram at the bow.

Service history
Messina was ordered by the Royal Sardinian Navy, but by the time she was laid down at the Regio Cantiere di Castellammare di Stabia (Royal Dockyard in Castellammare di Stabia) on 28 September 1861, much of Italy had unified, creating the Regia Marina (Royal Navy). She was launched on 20 December 1864 and completed in February 1867. This was too late to see action during the Third Italian War of Independence, which had ended the previous August;  was the only member of her class to have been completed in time for the war. The conflict nevertheless had a significant effect on Messinas career. The government lost confidence in the fleet after the defeat at the Battle of Lissa and drastically reduced the naval budget. The cuts were so severe that the fleet had great difficulty in mobilizing its ironclad squadron to attack the port of Civitavecchia in September 1870, as part of the wars of Italian unification. Instead, the ships were laid up and the sailors conscripted to man them were sent home.

In addition, Messina was rapidly surpassed first by central battery and then turret ships, which rendered the first generation of ironclads with traditional broadside obsolete. As a result, Messina was not used in any significant way in her ten years in service. In around 1870, the ship's armament was revised to six  guns, four 8 in guns, and eight 164 mm guns. In 1880, the Navy struck Messina from the list of ships and broke her up for scrap. The Navy discarded both of her sisters, along with the ironclad  between 1875 and 1880 to remove the cost of maintaining them from the naval budget, as part of an effort to reduce the financial impact of the new  and es then under construction.

Notes

References

External links
 Messina Marina Militare website 

Messina
Ships built in Castellammare di Stabia
1864 ships